The 2002 Swindon Borough Council election took place on 2 May 2002 to elect members of Swindon Unitary Council in Wiltshire, England. One third of the council was up for election and the council stayed under no overall control.

After the election, the composition of the council was
Labour 29
Conservative 22
Liberal Democrat 8

Voting pilot
The election in Swindon was one of thirty that trialed different methods of voting or counting in the 2002 local elections, with Swindon having a trial of voting via the internet. The trial results had 5% of voters using the phone to cast a vote and over 10% voting via the internet. A survey in Swindon found that those who voted via the Internet were more likely to be younger and male than those who voted at a polling station. Overall turnout in the election was 31.33%.

Election result

Ward results

References

2002 English local elections
2002
2000s in Wiltshire